Acyphoderes abdominalis is a species of beetle in the family Cerambycidae. It was described by Olivier in 1795.

References

Acyphoderes
Beetles described in 1795